The name Elmwood Giants has been used since 1905 by various Canadian baseball teams based in the Elmwood community of Winnipeg, Manitoba.

, the Elmwood Giants Baseball Club, Inc. operates four teams: the Elmwood Giants Juniors (AAA) (members of the Manitoba Junior Baseball League), the Elmwood Giants Juniors (AA) (members of the Winnipeg Junior Baseball League), the Elmwood Giants Seniors (members of the Winnipeg Senior Baseball League) and the Kildonan Mudcats (also members of the Winnipeg Senior Baseball League). In past decades, earlier versions of the club have operated teams at different age levels and in various leagues, including the Mandak League.

The 2010 edition of the Junior team won the MJBL pennant and the Western Canada Baseball Association Junior AAA championship.

The 2010 edition of the Senior team won the WSBL pennant and the Baseball Manitoba Senior AA All-Stars tournament. They were also finalists (silver medalists) in the Western Canada Baseball Association Senior AA Championship.

Notable players
Bob Harvey
Tom Parker
Ted "Double Duty" Radcliffe
Terry Sawchuk
John Washington
Solly Drake
Corey Koskie
Trevor Kidd
Lloyd Davenport

Baseball teams in Winnipeg